Stigmatoteuthis hoylei, commonly called the flowervase jewel squid, is a species of cock-eyed squid. It is native to tropical and subtropical waters of the Indian and Pacific Oceans. It grows to 20 cm in mantle length. The eyes of this species are highly dimorphic.

References

External links

Squid
Molluscs of the Indian Ocean
Molluscs of the Pacific Ocean
Taxa named by Edwin Stephen Goodrich
Molluscs described in 1896